David Bellemere (born 1972 in Paris, France) is a beauty photographer.

Career 
David Bellemere began photophraphy in school. His interest led him to study at an Art School in Paris.
While in college, Bellemere was commissioned by several French magazines for his work. After graduation, he traveled all over Asia for two years.  In this time he focused his work on the use of natural light, architecture and fashion. 

His work is recognized for the use of unique lighting, colours, and composition.  

His work for a nude muses calendar named NU Muses is depicted in the 2017 documentary film Nude.

References

1972 births
Living people
French photographers
Artists from Paris

Fashion photographers